The  consists of numerous repositories located in the capital city of each of the provinces of Italy, along with several additional local sub-branches ("sezione"). It is overseen by a central office which is part of the Ministry of Cultural Heritage and Activities and Tourism in Rome. The following list is arranged by administrative macroregion and region.

List of State Archives by region

Centre

Lazio
 Archivio di Stato di Frosinone
 Sezione di Archivio di Stato di Anagni-Guarcino
 Archivio di Stato di Latina
 Archivio di Stato di Rieti
 
 Archivio di Stato di Viterbo

Marche
 Archivio di Stato di Ancona 
 Sezione di Archivio di Stato di Fabriano
 Archivio di Stato di Ascoli Piceno
 Archivio di Stato di Fermo
 Archivio di Stato di Macerata
 Sezione di Archivio di Stato di Camerino
 Archivio di Stato di Pesaro
 Sezione di Archivio di Stato di Fano
 Sezione di Archivio di Stato di Urbino

Tuscany
 Archivio di Stato di Arezzo
 Florence State Archives
 Archivio di Stato di Grosseto
 Archivio di Stato di Livorno 
 
 Archivio di Stato di Massa
 Sezione di Archivio di Stato di Pontremoli
 
 Archivio di Stato di Pistoia
 Sezione di Archivio di Stato di Pescia
 Archivio di Stato di Prato

Umbria
 
 Sezione di Archivio di Stato di Assisi
 Sezione di Archivio di Stato di Foligno
 Sezione di Archivio di Stato di Gubbio
 Sezione di Archivio di Stato di Spoleto
 Archivio di Stato di Terni
 Sezione di Archivio di Stato di Orvieto

Islands

Sardinia
 Archivio di Stato di Cagliari
 Archivio di Stato di Nuoro
 Archivio di Stato di Oristano
 Archivio di Stato di Sassari

Sicily
 Archivio di Stato di Agrigento
 Sezione di Archivio di Stato di Sciacca
 Archivio di Stato di Caltanissetta
 Archivio di Stato di Catania
 Sezione di Archivio di Stato di Caltagirone
 Archivio di Stato di Enna
 Archivio di Stato di Messina
 
 Sezione di Archivio di Stato di Termini Imerese
 Archivio di Stato di Ragusa
 Sezione di Archivio di Stato di Modica
 Archivio di Stato di Siracusa
 Sezione di Archivio di Stato di Noto
 Archivio di Stato di Trapani

North-East

Emilia-Romagna
 Archivio di Stato di Bologna
 Sezione di Archivio di Stato di Imola
 Archivio di Stato di Ferrara
 Archivio di Stato di Forlì-Cesena
 
 
 
 Archivio di Stato di Ravenna
 Sezione di Archivio di Stato di Faenza
 Archivio di Stato di Reggio Emilia
 Archivio di Stato di Rimini

Friuli-Venezia Giulia
 Archivio di Stato di Gorizia
 Archivio di Stato di Pordenone
 Archivio di Stato di Trieste
 Archivio di Stato di Udine

Trentino-Alto Adige
 Archivio di Stato di Bolzano
 Archivio di Stato di Trento

Veneto
 Archivio di Stato di Belluno
 Archivio di Stato di Padova
 Archivio di Stato di Rovigo
 Archivio di Stato di Treviso
 
 Archivio di Stato di Verona
 Archivio di Stato di Vicenza
 Sezione di Archivio di Stato di Bassano del Grappa

North-West

Liguria
 
 Archivio di Stato di Imperia
 Sezione di Archivio di Stato di San Remo
 Sezione di Archivio di Stato di Ventimiglia
 Archivio di Stato della Spezia
 Archivio di Stato di Savona

Lombardy
 Archivio di Stato di Bergamo
 Archivio di Stato di Brescia
 Archivio di Stato di Como
 Archivio di Stato di Cremona
 Archivio di Stato di Lecco
 Archivio di Stato di Lodi
 .
 
 
 Archivio di Stato di Sondrio
 Archivio di Stato di Varese

Piedmont
 Archivio di Stato di Alessandria
 Archivio di Stato di Asti
 Archivio di Stato di Biella
 Archivio di Stato di Cuneo
 Archivio di Stato di Novara
 . Directors have included  (1918–1931).
 Archivio di Stato di Verbania
 Archivio di Stato di Vercelli
 Sezione di Archivio di Stato di Varallo

South

Abruzzo
 Archivio di Stato di Chieti
 Sezione di Archivio di Stato di Lanciano
 Archivio di Stato dell'Aquila
 Sezione di Archivio di Stato di Avezzano
 Sezione di Archivio di Stato di Sulmona
 Archivio di Stato di Pescara
 Archivio di Stato di Teramo

Apulia
 Archivio di Stato di Bari
 Sezione di Archivio di Stato di Barletta
 Sezione di Archivio di Stato di Trani
 Archivio di Stato di Brindisi
 Archivio di Stato di Foggia
 Sezione di Archivio di Stato di Lucera
 Archivio di Stato di Lecce
 Archivio di Stato di Taranto

Basilicata
 Archivio di Stato di Matera
 Archivio di Stato di Potenza

Calabria
 Archivio di Stato di Catanzaro
 Sezione di Archivio di Stato di Lamezia Terme
 Archivio di Stato di Cosenza
 Sezione di Archivio di Stato di Castrovillari
 Archivio di Stato di Crotone
 Archivio di Stato di Reggio Calabria
 Sezione di Archivio di Stato di Locri
 Sezione di Archivio di Stato di Palmi
 Archivio di Stato di Vibo Valentia

Campania
 Archivio di Stato di Avellino
 Archivio di Stato di Benevento
 Archivio di Stato di Caserta
 Archivio di Stato di Napoli

Molise
 Archivio di Stato di Campobasso
 Archivio di Stato di Isernia

See also
 , which oversees archival heritage around the country
 Central Archives of the State (Italy), which preserves documentation related to the central offices of the nation of Italy
 Ministry of Cultural Heritage and Activities and Tourism (Italy)
 List of archives in Italy

References

This article incorporates information from the Italian Wikipedia.

Bibliography
 
 
 
 
  1963-1997. v.1
  (includes information about the State Archives)

External links

Images

Archives in Italy
Italy history-related lists